Kullar is a village in the District of Koçarlı, Aydın Province, Turkey. As of 2010 it had a population of 232 people. It is also a Turkish last name for people from there.

References

Villages in Koçarlı District